Rai Yoyo is an Italian free-to-air television channel owned and operated by state-owned public broadcaster RAI – Radiotelevisione italiana. It is the company's television channel for kids, and is known for its programming for children between the ages of four to seven.

History
On 1 November 2006, RaiSat Ragazzi was split into two channels: RaiSat Yoyo (for preschoolers) and RaiSat Smash. Notable programs include Il Postino Pat, Little Red Tractor, Fifi and the Flowertots, among others

On 31 July 2009, RaiSat Yoyo became a free-to-air channel on the new satellite platform Tivù Sat and was replaced by Nick Jr. on Sky Italia.

On 18 May 2010, when Rai rebranded all its channels, the name RaiSat was extinguished, and the channel was renamed Rai Yoyo.

In May 2016, the channel stopped broadcasting advertisements on air.

Logos and identities

References

External links
 

YOYO
Children's television networks
Television channels and stations established in 2006
Italian-language television stations
Preschool education television networks